Agostinho Neto Pioneer Organization (OPA) is a pioneer movement in Angola. Founded as the Pioneers in 1975, the organization took the name of the nation's first president Agostinho Neto at its second conference in November 1979, following Neto's death. OPA is led in its day-to-day affairs by the MPLA Youth.

References

MPLA
Pioneer movement
Youth organizations established in the 1970s
Youth wings of political parties in Angola